The North Side Gang, also known as the North Side Mob, was an Irish-Polish-American criminal organization within Chicago during the Prohibition era from the early 1920s to the mid-1930s. It was the principal rival of the South Side Gang, also known as the Chicago Outfit, the crime syndicate of Italian-Americans Johnny Torrio and Al Capone.

History of the North Side Gang

Early history 
Like many other Chicago-based Prohibition gangs, the North Side Gang originated from the Market Street Gang, one of many street gangs in Chicago at the turn of the 20th century.  The Market Street Gang was made up of pickpockets, sneak thieves and labor sluggers working in the 42nd and 43rd Wards. The gang especially distinguished itself during the newspaper "Circulation Wars" of the early 1910s between the Chicago Examiner and the Chicago Tribune.

It was during the Circulation Wars that future North Side leader Dean O'Banion, then a member of the juvenile satellite Little Hellions, would develop valuable contacts with politicians and journalists. O'Banion and other members of the North Siders would be mentored by safecracker Charlie "The Ox" Reiser. O'Banion was one of the many Market Streeters to become a bootlegger.

Prohibition
With the start of Prohibition, the North Siders quickly took control of the existing breweries and distilleries in the North Side of Chicago.  This gave them a near monopoly on the local supply of real beer and high quality whiskey; their rivals only had supplies of rotgut liquor and moonshine. Based on the North Clark Street restaurant McGovern's Saloon and Café, the North Side Gang would soon control the working-class neighborhoods of the 42nd and 43rd Wards within months. In addition to bootlegging, the gang continued to burglarize local stores and warehouses and run illegal gambling operations.  Unlike the rival Chicago Outfit, however, they refused to traffic in prostitution.

O'Banion strengthened his political protection by assisting his politician friends in committing election fraud. He also ran a publicity campaign in the North Side, with large-scale donations to orphanages and charities as well as food and loans to the poor and unemployed.

The old hostility between Irish and Italian gangs, combined with O'Banion's refusal to sell portions of North Side distilleries to the South Siders, raised tension between the North and South Siders. During several meetings arranged by Torrio, O'Banion would often insult the Italians. O'Banion also secretly hijacked South Side beer shipments and sold them back to their owners. However, the North Side Gang also ran into trouble with other ethnic gangs; in 1921, O'Banion shot Ragen's Colts member Davy "Yiddles" Miller after he insulted a North Sider at a local opera.

Although O'Banion was arrested and charged with burglary in 1922, the North Side Gang enjoyed considerable protection from the Chicago police department. At one point, O'Banion threw a lavish banquet for Chicago politicians and police officials.  Attendees included Chief Detective Michael Hughes, Police Lieutenant Charles Evans, County Clerk Robert Sweitzer, Public Works commissioner Colonel Albert A. Sprague, and a host of both Democratic and Republican politicians. Dubbed the "Balshazzar Feast" by the press, it was later investigated by reform Mayor William E. Dever.

In 1924, Chicago police assisted the North Side Gang in robbing the Sibly Distillery, which had been under federal guard since the beginning of Prohibition. Escorted by Police Lieutenant Michael Grady and four detective sergeants, North Siders looted the distillery in broad daylight, taking 1,750 barrels of bonded whiskey worth approximately $100,000. Although Grady and the other police officers were later indicted for this crime, they were quickly dismissed.

Relations between the North and South Side gangs continued to fester. In early 1924, O'Banion agreed to an alliance with Torrio and Capone that was brokered by Mike Merlo. However, the alliance began to flounder when O'Banion demanded that Angelo Genna pay a $30,000 gambling debt from losses at the co-owned gambling casino The Ship. This demand contravened an agreement allowing Angelo and other gang members to run up debts there. In the interest of maintaining harmony, Torrio persuaded Genna to pay his gambling debt.

However, Torrio himself would lose patience when O'Banion offered to sell him the valuable Sieben Brewery. On May 19, 1924, while Torrio was inspecting the property, O'Banion arranged for the police to raid the place and arrest Torrio.  After his release from custody, Torrio acceded to demands from the Genna crime family, allies of Chicago Outfit, to kill O'Banion.

On November 10, shortly after the death of Merlo, Frankie Yale, John Scalise, and Albert Anselmi reportedly entered the Schofield Flower Shop owned by O'Banion and shot him dead. This was to be the beginning of a five-year gang war between the North Side Gang against Johnny Torrio's Chicago Outfit that would climax with the St. Valentine's Day Massacre in 1929.

War with the Chicago Outfit
After the death of O'Banion, Hymie Weiss assumed leadership of the North Side Gang and immediately struck back at his rivals. On January 12, 1925, Weiss, Bugs Moran, and Vincent Drucci attempted to kill Torrio's lieutenant, Al Capone, at a Chicago South Side restaurant. Firing at Capone's car, the men wounded chauffeur Sylvester Barton, but missed Capone entirely. Capone, unnerved by the shooting, ordered his famous armored car to be created. Moran then decided to kidnap one of Capone's trusted bodyguards, torturing him for information before finally executing him and dumping the body.

On January 24, shortly after the assassination attempt on Capone had taken place, Weiss, Moran, and Drucci ambushed Torrio as he returned from shopping with his wife. Both Torrio and his chauffeur Robert Barton were wounded several times. As Moran was about to kill Torrio, the gun misfired; the gang members were forced to flee the scene as the police arrived. After narrowly surviving this attack, Torrio decided he wanted out. After serving time on bootlegging charges Torrio retired to Italy, passing leadership of the Chicago Outfit to Capone.

Weiss and the North Siders then went after the Genna brothers, leaders of the Genna crime family. First, "Bloody" Angelo Genna was shot to death by Moran after a car chase. Next, Mike "The Devil" Genna was shot down by police when he turned his gun on them after a shootout with the North siders. Then Drucci killed Samuzzo "Samoots" Amatuna, a Genna family backer. Finally, Antonio "The Gentleman" Genna was murdered (although it was rumored that Capone, not Weiss, ordered this). At this point, the remaining Genna brothers fled Chicago. The North Siders and Capone took the spoils.

The North siders under Weiss, Drucci and Moran

Soon after Dean O'Banion's death, the North Siders had formed a "governing council" with Hymie Weiss emerging as leader. Although the loss of O'Banion was a shock to them, the gang was at the height of its power. The Genna family was gone, Torrio had been scared out of the rackets, and Capone was on the defensive. The North Siders expanded their business and strength and plotted another attack on Capone.

In the second North Side attack on Capone, a fleet of North Side cars, with Moran in the lead car, drove to Capone's hotel in Cicero. While Capone and his bodyguard were drinking downstairs, the North Siders drove by the lobby and opened fire with their Thompson submachine guns. Capone and his bodyguard were forced to take cover on the floor. Once the attack was over, Capone sent word to the North Siders that he wanted a truce. A truce was made, which inevitably began to come apart.

Some time later, Capone struck back at the North Siders by gunning down Hymie Weiss and several of his associates. Drucci and Moran now assumed joint leadership of the North Side Gang. The two gangs traded killings and bombings for several more months until a peace conference was held.

Moran and Capone both appeared at the meeting along with many other mob bosses. During the conference, Capone complained that "they were making a shooting gallery of a great business." He also stated that "Chicago should be seen as a pie and each gang gets a slice of the pie." The two gangs agreed to make peace. This peace would last for a while, during which no killings occurred as a result of gang war. Drucci was killed during this time, but it resulted from a brawl with police. Moran now became the sole boss of the North Side Gang.

However, conflict eventually started again. Moran would regularly hijack Capone's beer shipments, aggravating Capone. Capone retaliated by burning down Moran's dog track. A few days later, Capone's own dog track went up in smoke. Moran was the prime suspect.

Open warfare started again between the two gangs. Moran ordered the execution of two union leaders who were powerful allies and personal friends of Capone. This act prompted Capone to order the St. Valentine's Day Massacre.

St. Valentine's Day Massacre

On February 14, 1929, four unidentified men, two of them dressed as Chicago police officers, entered a North Side Street garage and ordered six members of the North Side Gang and a friend of a gang member to stand against a wall. The gunmen then pulled out machine guns and gunned them all down. The only survivor, Frank "Tight Lips" Gusenberg, died hours later at a nearby Chicago hospital refusing to name his attackers. However, the primary target of the gunmen, Bugs Moran, leader of the North Side Gang, was not at the garage and escaped harm. Strong circumstantial cases can be made for almost a dozen individuals as being one of the gunmen, but it remains unknown to this day exactly who those four gunmen were.

Known as the St. Valentine's Day Massacre, the attack effectively left the five-year gang war between Al Capone and Bugs Moran in a stalemate.  The brazenness of this crime resulted in a Federal crackdown on all gang activity in Chicago that eventually led to the downfall of both Moran and Capone.

Aftermath
Although Bugs Moran survived the St. Valentine's Day Massacre, several experienced North Side gunmen had been lost. The North Side Gang continued to control the 42nd and 43rd Wards and managed to thwart a takeover attempt by Frank McErlane in 1930.  As the decade progressed,  the power of the North Side Gang slowly declined. In 1936, Jack "Machine Gun" McGurn, alleged mastermind of the massacre, was killed and Moran was one of the prime suspects, along with Frank Nitti of the South Side mob, as McGurn had become more trouble for the South Side Gang than he was worth to protect.

Moran and the North Side Gang eventually lost control of their gambling operations to the new National Crime Syndicate.  Since the repeal of Prohibition, gambling had been the main source of North Side income. Bugs Moran eventually left the gang by 1935, after which it quickly dissolved.

North Side Gang members

Bosses
1919–1924 — Dean O'Banion (1892–1924)
1924–1926 — Hymie Weiss (1898 –1926)
1926–1927 — Vincent "The Schemer" Drucci (1898–1927)
1927–1935 — George "Bugs" Moran (1891–1957)

Other members

See also 
 Irish Mob
Chicago Outfit, primary rivals to the North Side Gang
 Antonio Lombardo, Unione Siciliane leader and Chicago Outfit consigliere
 James M. Ragen, Founder of the Ragen's Colts street gang and Chicago gangster.
 Watch Dogs, an open world video game developed by Ubisoft in 2014 which has the North Side Gang surviving and evolving into the Chicago South Club.

Further reading 

 Keefe, Rose. Guns and Roses: The Untold Story of Dean O'Banion, Chicago's Big Shot before Al Capone. Cumberland House, 336 pgs, 
 O'Kane, James M. Crooked Ladder: Gangsters, Ethnicity and the American Dream. New Brunswick, New Jersey: Transaction Publishers, 2004.

References 
 
 English, T.J. Paddy Whacked: The Untold Story of the Irish American Gangster. New York: HarperCollins, 2005. 
 Enright, Laura L. Chicago's Most Wanted: The Top Ten Book of Murderous Mobsters, Midway Monsters, and Windy City Oddities. Dulles, Virginia: Potomac Books Inc., 2005. 
 Zorbaugh, Harvey Warren. The Gold Coast and the Slum: Sociological Study of Chicago's Near North Side. Chicago: University of Chicago Press, 1929. 
 Mason City Globe-Gazette. Chicago Peddler of Alcohol Is Found Dead. Iowa: June 27, 1929(Page 4). Newspaper Archive.
 Decatur Review. Moran Gangster Latest Victim. Decatur, Illinois: June 27, 1929. Newspaper Archive.

 
Organizations established in 1919
1919 establishments in Illinois
Organizations disestablished in 1935
1935 disestablishments in Illinois
Former gangs in Chicago
Irish-American organized crime groups
North Side, Chicago
Prohibition gangs
Irish-American culture in Chicago